Sparganothina browni is a species of moth of the family Tortricidae. It is found in Veracruz, Mexico.

The length of the forewings is 9.2-9.4 mm for males and 8.9-9.6 mm for females. The forewings are cream, with blackish-brown markings. The hindwings are pale brown with a faint pattern of darker brown lines.

Etymology
The species is named in honour of Dr. John W. Brown.

References

Moths described in 2001
Sparganothini